Annavaram is a 2006 Indian Telugu-language action drama film directed by Bhimaneni Srinivasa Rao and stars Pawan Kalyan & Asin Thottumkal in the lead roles. Megaa Super Good Films produced the film. The film is a remake of Tamil film Thirupaachi. The film released on 29 December 2006. However, the soundtrack of the film was released on 14 December 2006 mixed reviews and was an average at the box-office praising Kalyan's action role. It also marked Asin's last Telugu film, to date.

Plot 
 
Annavaram is a blacksmith living in a remote village near Annavaram. He has a lovable sister, Varam. He runs into some hilarious incidents while searching locally for a groom for his sister. He confides to his friend Narasimha that he wants his sister to be in a good city after her marriage. Annavaram nods his acceptance when a city guy proposes to Varam. He accompanies the newlyweds to Hyderabad and falls in love with Aishwarya after initial mishaps.

On a trip to Hyderabad, Annavaram saves a court witness from Tappas Balu, a don dominating central Hyderabad. He also learns of a local don Gutkha Pandu, who controls northern Hyderabad and troubles Varam's husband's canteen business. In an altercation at the Golconda Fort, Narasimha gets murdered by a thug Puranapool Ganga, who dominates southern Hyderabad. Varam's husband told Annavaram to leave Hyderabad if he wants his sister to be happy. After Narasimha's funeral, he leaves his hometown stating that he got a job in a cloth manufacturing company. In reality, he comes to Hyderabad with a mission.

Firstly, Annavaram kills 20 of Ganga's henchmen and a corrupt SI, who works for Ganga. He changes his name as 'Pothuraju'. Now Annavaram aka Pothuraju warns Ganga that the latter will be killed by him. He also calls ACP J. D. Yadav and warns him that he will kill all the dons of Hyderabad, as the police department fails in their duty. Later on, Annavaram's friend Sairam, who is a police inspector, learns about this. Pothuraju challenges Sairam that he will give up his mission if the latter keeps any one thug of Hyderabad at least for the single day. Sairam fails in his mission and loses his son, as he was killed by Balu.

This harsh lesson makes Sairam help Pothuraju. Sairam details Pothuraju about the entire mafia network of Hyderabad by providing the specification of who leads the various areas. Pothuraju writes their names in papers and randomly chooses Balu. He kills Balu stating that he is not killing, instead 'Slaying of Demons'. One day Aishwarya meets Pothuraju at the temple and finds that he is not working in any cloth manufacturing company. Pothuraju manages to make Aishwarya believe that he is working in a travels company. Thus, Aishwarya gets a promise from Pothuraju that he should meet her and spend time with her frequently.

Balu receives a letter from Pothuraju that he'll kill Balu within 24 hours.
He approaches ACP Yadav for protection but he says that they're being quiet whenever the goons harassing the public and now.
Balu kidnaps daughter of Yadav and threatens him to kill Pothuraju. Meanwhile, Pothuraju disguises himself as a wounded guy and caught by Balu's henchmen. In front of Balu, Pothuraju reveals his identity and kills all of them and saves the daughter of ACP.

Next, Pothuraju informs Ganga that he is going to kill Pandu and challenges to save him. After listening, Pandu hides himself in a politician's house to be away from the hands of Pothuraju. The politician damages his own car and house and makes the police believe that someone has attacked his house. The police decides to provide security for the politician. This makes Pandu feel happy, considering that Pothuraju can't come to his place by fooling all these inspectors and kill him. Sairam soon found out that Pandu is hiding in the politician's place.
Pothuraju wants Sairam to disband the police protection, but Sairam refused because it is the responsibility of the police to protect. He can only inform Pothuraju in which room he is in. Later on, Pothuraju brings a group of people who rally due to losing their money to a fraud financier who is hiding in the politician's place. With the rally, Pothuraju enters the Pandu's fort and kills him. Yadav inquires the people that involve the rally regarding the identity of Pothuraju. However, nobody wants to tell anything because they fell that Pothuraju is doing the police's job while the police do nothing and wait for their salary. Yadav's daughter is willing to die rather than to reveal Pothuraju's identity because she was rescued by Pothuraju from Balu.

Later on, Pothuraju decides to kill Ganga in December 31 and warns him by posting Ganga's funeral posters and sending him the coffin at the same day. This makes Ganga angry and at that moment, He beats his wife and asks about the posters. She tells that  this can be done by only Pothuraju. She also challenges Ganga to stay alive for this one night. This makes Ganga seek the protection of mass group of thugs from Hyderabad. He ignites the war between police group and mafia gang in a diplomatic manner. Pothuraju disguises himself as a police inspector and enter's Ganga's fort. Sairam helps Pothuraju in his mission by hurting himself. Yadav orders his squad to hit the thugs.

Pothuraju enters the house in a police uniform, confronts a thug, and forces him to wear a police uniform. After that, Pothuraju shoots and kills the thug and throws him out of the window. Thinking that one of the fellow officers is dead, Yadav orders for open fire. All the thugs were killed, but once they checked the dead 'police officer', they realised that it is Pothuraju's trick and move upstairs to find him. However, Pothuraju already stabbed Ganga and threw him to the ground right before the midnight of the new year. The movie ends with Aishwarya welcoming Pothuraju, Varam and her husband once again after returning home and completes with a happy note.

Cast 

 Pawan Kalyan as Pothuraju
 Asin as Aishwarya
 Sandhya as Varalakshmi "Varam"
 Lal as Puranapool Ganga
 Ashish Vidyarthi as Tappas Balu
 Siva Balaji as Varam's husband
 Brahmanandam as Purohitudu
 Nagendra Babu as ACP
 Venu Madhav as Narasimha
 Bhargavi as Seetha
 Bramhaji as Sairam
 Sunil as Raju
 Telangana Shakuntala
 Hema
 Tanikella Bharani
 Mallikarjuna Rao
 Raghu Babu
 Suman Setty
 Ranganath
 Dharmavarapu Subramanyam
 Uttej
 Narsing Yadav
 L. B. Sriram
 Chittajalu Lakshmipati
 Besant Ravi

Music 

Ramana Gogula composed music for the film. The album was launched in stores on 14 December 2006. The film has five songs composed by Ramana Gogula & a bit song (Aa Devudu Naakosam)- reused from the original film, but Chithra rendering the Telugu version :
 "Raakshasa Raajyam" – Shankar Mahadevan
 "Lucia" – Ramana Gogula
 "Jarra Soodu" – Tippu
 "Neevalle Neevalle" – Kalyani
 "Annayya Annavante" – Mano & Ganga
 "Aa Devudu Naakosam" – K. S. Chithra & Ramana Gogula

Release 
Idlebrain opined that "The plus points of the film are Pawan Kalyan, sentimental scenes with sister and the killing strategies in the second half. On the flip side, the direction of the film is old-fashioned". Rediff called the film "watchable".

References

External links 
 

2006 films
2000s Telugu-language films
Telugu remakes of Tamil films
2000s masala films
Indian films about revenge
Films directed by Bhimaneni Srinivasa Rao